Cecil Howell Travis (August 8, 1913 – December 16, 2006) was an American professional baseball player and scout. He played his entire career in Major League Baseball as a shortstop and third baseman for the Washington Senators from 1933 to 1947, losing four seasons to military service during World War II.

Biography
Travis was born on a farm in Riverdale, Georgia, the youngest of ten children, and declined a scholarship to Georgia Tech in favor of a scholarship to a baseball training school. Prior to 2019, it was the last pennant-winning campaign by a Washington team, although Travis did not play in the five-game World Series loss to the New York Giants. The following year he began to take over third base duties from veteran Ossie Bluege, and batted .319 as the team plummeted to seventh place. He followed by hitting .318, .317, .344 and .335, playing full-time at shortstop from 1937 to 1939, but the 82-71  team – on which he split time between shortstop and right field – would remain the only winning squad for which he would play regularly.

In  he was named to his first All-Star team, and placed ninth in the AL's MVP voting. After slipping to a .292 average in 1939 while suffering two cases of the flu, he returned with All-Star seasons in 1940 and 1941, hitting .322 and .359 (second in the AL as Ted Williams batted .406). In the latter year Travis enjoyed his best overall season with career highs of 101 runs batted in, 106 runs scored, 39 doubles, 19 triples and 7 home runs, along with his league-best 218 hits, and finished sixth in the MVP vote.

Travis entered the Army in the winter of 1941–42, and spent most of World War II in the United States, playing on military baseball teams. Sent to Europe in late 1944 while serving in the 76th Infantry Division, he suffered a severe case of frostbite during the Battle of the Bulge, necessitating an operation to prevent amputation of his feet. Travis received a Bronze Star for his military service. Although only 31 years old when he returned to baseball, he was not the same player as he had been before the war, and hit .241 in late 1945 and .252 in 1946. One month before his final game, he was honored with "Cecil Travis Night" at Griffith Stadium, with General Dwight D. Eisenhower in attendance.

In his career, Travis had 1544 hits, 665 runs, 657 RBI, 265 doubles, 78 triples, 27 home runs, 402 walks and 23 stolen bases in 1328 games. He was a Senators scout until 1956, and then returned to his family farm. He was inducted into the Georgia Sports Hall of Fame in 1975. He died at his home in December 2006 at age 93.

See also

List of Major League Baseball players who spent their entire career with one franchise

Further reading
Cecil Travis of the Washington Senators: The War-Torn Career of an All-Star Shortstop by Rob Kirkpatrick. University of Nebraska Press/Bison Books, 2009. .

External links
Cecil Travis of the Washington Senators: The War-Torn Career of an All-Star Shortstop – publisher's book page

Baseball Hall of Fame candidate profile
SABR biography
Cecil Travis – Baseballbiography.com
Retrosheet
The Baseball Page – biography
Washington Post obituary
The Atlanta Journal-Constitution: "Only war could keep him from Hall of Fame"
New York Times obituary
Baseball Think Factory – discussion of Hall of Fame candidacy

1913 births
2006 deaths
American League All-Stars
Baseball players from Georgia (U.S. state)
Chattanooga Lookouts players
Major League Baseball shortstops
People from Riverdale, Georgia
Sportspeople from the Atlanta metropolitan area
United States Army personnel of World War II
United States Army soldiers
Washington Senators (1901–1960) players
Washington Senators (1901–60) scouts